Kazimiera Zawistowska de domo Jasieńska, pseudonym Ira, (1870–1902) was a Polish poet and translator.

Zawistowska was an author of modernist erotic and landscape poems related with mysticism, symbolism and Parnassianism. She published her works in Kraków and Warsaw magazines – Życie, Krytyka and Chimera. Zawistowska translated poems of Belgian and French symbolists, including Charles Baudelaire, Paul Verlaine, Albert Samain.

Biography
Kazimiera Zawistowska was born in 1870 in Rasztowce, Podolia. After education, she moved to Switzerland and Italy. After back to Poland, she married with Stanisław Jastrzębiec-Zawistowski and lived with him in Supranówka in Podolia.

She died on 28 February 1902 in Kraków. The cause of death was probably suicide.

Notable works
Collections of poems published posthumously
 Poezje (1903) – with preface written by Zenon Przesmycki
 Poezje (1923)
 Utwory zebrane (1982)

Sources

External links

1870 births
1902 deaths
Modernist poets
Modernist women writers
Polish women poets
Polish translators
Symbolist poets
Translators to Polish
Translators from French
19th-century Polish poets
19th-century translators
19th-century Polish women writers
1902 suicides
People from Ternopil Oblast
Suicides in Poland